Bidens frondosa is a North American species of flowering plant in the aster family, Asteraceae. It is widespread across much of Canada, the United States, and Mexico It is known in many other parts of the world as an introduced species, including Europe, Asia, Morocco, and New Zealand. Its many common names include devil's beggarticks, devil's-pitchfork, devil's bootjack, sticktights, bur marigold, pitchfork weed, tickseed sunflower, leafy beggarticks, and common beggar-ticks.

Ecology and habitat 
Bidens frondosa grows best where there is ample soil moisture and sun, especially in areas where something has disrupted the existing plant community leaving bare ground. It can survive in water saturated soils, frequently found growing at the water's edge, in drainage ditches or on flood plains.

The defoliating caterpillar of Hadjina chinensis, which is limited to Bidens species, has been observed on this plant.

Morphology 

The stems are square in cross-section and may branch near the top. The inflorescence is often a solitary flower head, but there may be pairs or arrays of several heads. The head contains many orange disc florets. Most flower heads lack ray florets but some may have a few small yellow rays. The fruit is a flat black or brown barbed cypsela up to a centimeter long which has two obvious hornlike pappi at one end.

The barbed pappi on the fruit help it stick to animals, facilitating seed dispersal.

Invasive species
This plant is invasive in some parts of the world. In New Zealand it is classed as an environmental weed by the Department of Conservation. It is also weedy in its native range, occurring in pastures and fields and along roadsides.

References

External links

 CalPhotos photos gallery, University of California

frondosa
Flora of North America
Plants described in 1753
Taxa named by Carl Linnaeus
Invasive plant species in Japan